W. Gibbs Bartleet (1829 – 10 March 1906) was an English Victorian architect.

Life
Bartleet was born in Handsworth, Birmingham. During his career, he was based in the Old Broad Street in the City of London, and in Brentwood, Essex.

He was honorary surveyor of the German Hospital at Dalston, where he is mentioned as having carried out extensive repairs by 1857.

Among his works was the grandiose rebuilding of St. George's Church, Beckenham (1885-1887), formerly a "humble medieval village church."

In 1870 he added a chancel and south transept to Alexander Dick Gough's St. Saviour's Church, Herne Hill (built 1856, demolished 1981). At Upminster he largely rebuilt the medieval church of St. Laurance in 1863, and in 1872-3 remodelled Hill Place for Temple Soanes in a restrained Gothic style, of diapered red brick with stone facings. He also enlarged or rebuilt the churches of St Mary, Dunton, Essex, St. Mary the Virgin, Shenfield and St. Michael and All Angels, Wilmington Kent.

In London he built offices for the Promoter Life Assurance Company in a neo-Renaissance style in Fleet Street, and in 1873 refronted a pair of eighteenth century terraced houses in Henrietta Street, Covent Garden in an Italianate style for the London and County Bank. He designed several other branches for the bank, including one at Guildford (1886). At Chigwell, Essex, he designed Woodlands (later renamed Woodview)as a large country house for the brewing magnate, Philip Savill, in 1881.

His son, Sydney Francis Bartleet, (fl. 1879-1927), also an architect, was taken into the partnership in 1891.

References

1829 births
1906 deaths
19th-century English architects
Architects from Birmingham, West Midlands
People from Brentwood, Essex
English ecclesiastical architects
People from Handsworth, West Midlands